The Confederate States Secretary of the Treasury was the head of the Confederate States Department of the Treasury. Three men served in this post throughout the Confederacy's brief existence from 1861 to 1865.

List of Secretaries of the Treasury

See also
United States Secretary of the Treasury

References

Lists of government ministers
Government of the Confederate States of America
 
1861 establishments in the Confederate States of America